Edward Harwood (1729–1794) was an English scholar and theologian.

Edward Harwood may also refer to:

Edward Harwood (English Army officer) (1586–1632), English Puritan soldier
Edward Harwood (of Darwen) (1707–1787), English composer
Edward C. Harwood (1900–1980), economist, philosopher of science and investment advisor
Edward Harwood (American inventor) (born 1950), pioneer of Aeroponics